John P. Dobyns (March 8, 1944August 28, 2020) was an American politician who served in the Wisconsin State Assembly from 1993 to 1999.

Biography
Dobyns was born on March 8, 1944, in Fond du Lac, Wisconsin. He graduated from St. Mary's Springs High School and the University of Wisconsin-Oshkosh. From 1964 to 1969 and again from 1974 to 1995, Dobyns was a member of the United States Army Reserve. During that time, he graduated from the United States Army Command and General Staff College and retired with the rank of lieutenant colonel. He was also a member of the Fond du Lac County, Wisconsin Sheriff's Department. Dobyns is married with two children and is a member of the Knights of Columbus, Catholic War Veterans, the Benevolent and Protective Order of Elks and the Fraternal Order of Eagles.

He died of liver disease on August 28, 2020, in Oshkosh, Wisconsin at age 76.

Political career
Dobyns was first elected to the Assembly in 1992. He was a Republican.

References

1944 births
2020 deaths
Politicians from Fond du Lac, Wisconsin
Republican Party members of the Wisconsin State Assembly
Military personnel from Wisconsin
United States Army officers
American deputy sheriffs
University of Wisconsin–Oshkosh alumni
United States Army Command and General Staff College alumni